This is the list of national secretaries of Christian Democracy, a political party in Italy.

Politics of Italy